Harold Martin Schroder (February 19, 1923 – December 24, 2013) was professor of psychology at Princeton University who conducted research into the so-called 'High Performance Leadership Competencies'.

Their validation across public and private organisations was carried out by Schroder and his colleagues initially while he was Professor of Management at the University of South Florida. and  later in US and UK corporations, including RBS 

Many leadership development consultancies utilize the so-called 'Schroder framework' he described as an objective measure of leadership behaviour critical for managing complexity and change.

His book Managerial Competence: The Key to Excellence was featured in Personnel Today's seven must-read books in 2006.

Books

Other publications

References 

1923 births
2013 deaths
Australian psychologists
20th-century American psychologists
University of Sydney alumni
Ohio State University alumni
Princeton University faculty
Australian emigrants to the United States